The 1933–34 season was the 57th Scottish football season in which Dumbarton competed at national level, entering the Scottish Football League and the Scottish Cup.  In addition Dumbarton competed in the Dumbartonshire Cup.

Scottish League

Dumbarton had their best season since their return to the Second Division 11 years earlier by finishing 6th out of 18, with 37 points – just 8 behind champions Albion Rovers.  It could have so been much better, particularly with just 2 home defeats, but as with many previous seasons it was the inability to win away from Boghead which prevented any real promotion hopes.

Scottish Cup

There was another first round exit, this time to Arbroath.

Dumbartonshire Cup
Dumbarton lost the Dumbartonshire Cup to non-league Vale Ocaba.

Friendlies

Player statistics

|}

Source:

Transfers

Players in

Players out 

In addition William Gilmour, Henry McAvoy, William McGall, Sam McNee, Michael Noone and Alex Parlane all played their last games in Dumbarton 'colours'.

Source:

References

Dumbarton F.C. seasons
Scottish football clubs 1933–34 season